Burkheart Steve Ellis Jr. (born 18 September 1992) is a Barbadian sprinter. He competed in the men's 200 metres at the 2016 Summer Olympics.

His mother Sophia Ifill and father Burkheart Ellis Sr. (who represented Barbados) were both athletes.

International competitions

1Disqualified in the final

2Disqualified in the semifinals

References

1992 births
Living people
Barbadian male sprinters
Olympic athletes of Barbados
Athletes (track and field) at the 2016 Summer Olympics
Track and field athletes from Raleigh, North Carolina
Athletes (track and field) at the 2015 Pan American Games
Pan American Games competitors for Barbados
Athletes (track and field) at the 2018 Commonwealth Games
Commonwealth Games competitors for Barbados
World Athletics Championships athletes for Barbados
Central American and Caribbean Games gold medalists for Barbados
Competitors at the 2018 Central American and Caribbean Games
American people of Barbadian descent
Central American and Caribbean Games medalists in athletics